Night of Your Life may refer to:

 Night of Your Life (J. Williams song)
 Night of Your Life (David Guetta song)